The 1976 World Junior Ice Hockey Championships were between December 26, 1975, and January 1, 1976, in Tampere, Turku, Pori and Rauma Finland.
The Soviet team won the tournament with a perfect 4–0 record.
This was the third edition of the Ice Hockey World Junior Championship, but the results are not included in official IIHF records.
Canada was represented by a club team, the Sherbrooke Castors, while the other four nations were represented by teams of their top under-20 players.  The United States did not participate in this tournament, after having competed in the 1974 and 1975 tournaments.

Final standings
The tournament was a round-robin format, with each team playing each of the other four teams once each.

Results

Scoring leaders

Tournament awards

References

 "Matches internationaux des moins de 20 ans 1975/76". Retrieved 2011-10-18.

World Junior Ice Hockey Championships
World Junior Ice Hockey Championships
World Junior Ice Hockey Championships
1976
December 1975 sports events in Europe
January 1976 sports events in Europe
World Junior Ice Hockey Championships
World Junior Ice Hockey Championships
International sports competitions in Turku
Sports competitions in Tampere
1970s in Turku
Sport in Pori
Rauma, Finland